JS Hayashio (SS-585) was the third ship of the submarine of Japan Maritime Self-Defense Force.

Development and design 

This type is a teardrop type ship type, a so-called SSS (Single Screw Submarine) type with a single-axis propulsion system, and the structural style is a complete double-shell structure, following the method since the Uzushio-class (42SS) in the basic design concept . Meanwhile, the type, dual vibration-damping support of the anti-vibration support or main engine of the main motor, the auxiliary equipment and pipe systems, static power supply, and rectification of the hole opening on the bottom of the ship. Through these efforts, it was decided that the masker sound insulation device was unnecessary, and in the latter model of this model, it was so quiet that it would not be detected even if snorkeling was continued until the sonobuoy was visible.

Construction and career 
Hayashio was laid down at Kawasaki Heavy Industries Kobe Shipyard on 9 December 1988 as the 1988 plan 2400-ton submarine No. 8100 and it was launched on 17 January 1991. She was commissioned on 25 March 1992 and homeported in Kure. She belonged to the 5th Submarine of the 1st Submarine Group.

From 25 August until 27 November, she participated in RIMPAC 1993.

She participated in RIMPAC 1998.

From 31 August until 3 December, she participated in RIMPAC 1999.

On March 7, 2008, she was reclassified to a training submarine, the ship registration number was changed to TSS-3606, and it was transferred to the 1st training submarine under the direct control of the submarine fleet .

She was decommissioned on 15 March 2011 and scrapped in Dokai Bay, Kyushu in April 2014.

Gallery

Citations

External links

Ships built by Kawasaki Heavy Industries
1991 ships
Harushio-class submarines